Samson & Goliath, also known as Young Samson, is an American animated television series produced by Hanna-Barbera Productions for NBC, where it debuted on September 9, 1967. Primarily sponsored by General Mills, who controlled the distribution rights through its agency Dancer Fitzgerald Sample, Samson & Goliath was retitled Young Samson in April 1968 to avoid confusion with the stop-motion Christian television series Davey and Goliath.

Twenty-six 12-minute episodes of the series were produced, six of which no longer exist. Samson & Goliath cartoons were paired with other General Mills-sponsored shows such as Tennessee Tuxedo and Go Go Gophers to form a full half-hour for their original network broadcasts. Young Samson was later shown in syndication with The Space Kidettes as The Space Kidettes and Young Samson, distributed by The Program Exchange. The rights were acquired by Warner Bros. Television Distribution when it became rights owner of the Hanna-Barbera catalog.

The series was the only Dancer Fitzgerald Sample-sponsored cartoon to be outsourced to Hanna-Barbera; the agency's in-house studio, Gamma Productions, had closed shortly before the series began. (It was also the only cartoon in the DFS portfolio not to be created either by Jay Ward Productions or by Total Television.)

Plot
The show follows the adventures of a teenager named Samson and his dog, Goliath as they ride around the country on a motorbike. Whenever trouble arises, usually in the form of a menacing mega villain or evil scientist, Samson transforms himself into a superhero version of the biblical Samson by hitting his golden wristbands together. A second slam transforms Goliath into a super-powered lion. He can also direct shock waves from his wristbands, and by twisting his bracelets, can increase his and Goliath's powers to far greater levels.

Similar shows
Samson & Goliath is similar in format to other Hanna-Barbera adventure shows such as Space Ghost, Moby Dick and Mighty Mightor, and Shazzan in its pacing, plots, voices, music and art direction. Many of these characters were developed for CBS by comics artist Alex Toth, but Samson was on NBC.

This show is very similar to a 1980s cartoon show, He-Man and the Masters of the Universe. Like Samson, teenage Prince Adam turns into the adult, muscular superhero He-Man by way of a magical artifact. Like Samson's Goliath, Adam's pet tiger Cringer also turns into the bigger, stronger and tougher Battle Cat. Both Samson & Goliath and He-Man (along with Moby Dick and Mighty Mightor) bear similarities to an earlier property, the Fawcett Comics (later DC Comics) superhero Captain Marvel. Samson striking bracelets on his wrists to transform himself is identical to how Rick Jones exchanges places with the Marvel Comics version of Captain Marvel in the late 1960s and the early 1970s.

Characters
 Samson, voiced by Tim Matheson, is a teenager who rides around the country on a motorbike with his dog Goliath. Upon encountering a very tough situation, Samson touches both of his bracelets with each other by crossing his wrists and with the magic words, "I need Samson Power" or "Time for Samson Power", upon which he is transformed into the biblical strong-man, and the lad's dog, who responds to the name of Goliath, metamorphoses into a mighty lion.
 Goliath's vocal effects were provided by Don Messick. He has black eyes, black ears, a black spot on his back, and a black right front paw, and the end of his tail is black in color. Goliath wears a brown leather collar around his neck with a small circular gold tag. His eyes' color turns to piercing green and his hair turns tan, with a dark brown mane and a dark brown tuft of fur on his tail. Despite the power transformation, Goliath still sports the same black right front paw. Goliath is a brave and resourceful pet in both his super-powered and non-powered forms. In his dog form, Goliath is an extremely good climber and is much more intelligent than a normal dog. In his lion form, Goliath is an incredibly powerful animal with a vast array of super-abilities, such as:
 super strength and resistance to physical injuries,
 his being an extremely good climber,
 a roar powerful enough to shatter solid rocks,
 claws that can rend steel,
 a tactic to grapple an opponent with his mighty tail,
 incredible leg muscles that allow him to execute truly mind-bending leaps,
 firing of blasts of concussive force,
 generation of searing heat,
 production of clouds of obscuring smoke,
 a heat-ray vision that enables him to emit destructive power beams from his eyes,
 firing of energy blasts from his forward-swept mane on occasion, and
 aiming of his energy blast at the ground for the purpose of quickly digging tunnels large enough for him and Samson to run through.

Villains
 Monatabu is an evil witch doctor whose tribe punished him for his evil deeds. He leapt into a volcano—but instead of dying, he found an Iguanasaurus. Each year, it emerges from the volcano to attack the village. Samson and Goliath discover the truth and seal the pair inside the volcano permanently.
 The Iguanasaurus is the giant lizard-like monster that came under the control of Monatabu.
 The Aurora Borealis Creature results from the Aurora Borealis somehow becoming an electrically charged monster that begins attacking an Inuit village. Samson and Goliath lure it onto an ice floe, and it sinks into the water, thus being destroyed.
 The Colossus of Rhodes is a 100 feet tall statue of the Greek Titan Helios that is brought back from sea by an archaeologist named Professor Andor. Meteorites bring it to life and it goes on a rampage. Samson and Goliath are able to send it back to the bottom of the sea.
 The Venusian Ice Men, all voiced by Don Messick, are robots from Venus who arrive on the planet Earth to freeze a valley to make it habitable for their kind. They are very intelligent and are quite capable of decision making. They can fire ice-spears and icicles, and can also shoot hailstones. At their best, they can create a giant ice monster. After defeating that ice monster, Samson and Goliath use a reflecting mirror from a telescope to deflect a freeze ray back at the villains's ship. The ship is destroyed and the Ice Men melt.
 Terrorists were an enemy Samson and Goliath faced in one episode. A band of international terrorists had managed to steal the STX-19 (though the title calls it the SXX-19), an experimental plane, and they also switched Samson's bracelets with lead ones. But Goliath recovered the real bracelets, and he and Samson were able to bring back the STX-19 and capture the thieves.
 The Terrorist Leader was voiced by Don Messick. His name was never revealed.
 Number 308 was a terrorist voiced by John Stephenson. One of the terrorists that targeted the STX-19, it was he who told his leader about Samson and Goliath being at the site of the STX-19.
 P.E.R.I.L. is an evil organization and master spy ring that plotted to capture Professor Talos to keep him from reaching the Pentagon where he will give the people there his plans for the Solar Jet. Samson and Goliath rescue him and capture the bad guys after an intense struggle. (Though its name was apparently an acronym, what the letters stood for was not revealed.)
 Monarch, voiced by Don Messick, is the leader of P.E.R.I.L.
 The Living Element is an anthropomorphic fire monster created by Monarch where it is P.E.R.I.L.'s most destructive weapon. Goliath used his power beams to warm it up enough for it to melt through the hull of P.E.R.I.L.'s ship and fall into the water.
 P.E.R.I.L. Agents, all voiced by John Stephenson, are the organic human foot soldiers of P.E.R.I.L.
 P.E.R.I.L. Robots are the robotic foot soldiers of P.E.R.I.L.
 Boltor is an evil scientist operating on Evil Island. Samson is captured, on the island, by a tribe who loyally serve a talking flame. He and Goliath discover that the evil scientist Boltor has an underground electronic laboratory and had created the talking flame as well as mechanical sharks. He has also stolen American missiles. Samson and Goliath foil Boltor's plan to launch the missiles, but he sinks the island disappearing for good.
 Zarno the Cruel is an alien based on an asteroid, from which he sends a deadly ray to Earth. Samson and Goliath are teleported to the asteroid where they defeat Zarno and his Monsteroids.
 The Monsteroids are asteroid monsters that work for Zarno.
 General Tong  and Ramu unleash the robot idol Rama-Keesh upon a mountain village. The General's purpose is to drive the people away so that his troops can move across the border. He orders Rama-Keesh to destroy Ramu, but Samson saves him.
 Ramu is General Tong's minion.
 Rama-Keesh is the robot idol unleashed by General Tong and Ramu on a mountain village. Rama-Keesh is destroyed when it falls into a fire pit, and Tong and Ramu are taken into custody.
 Salamandro is a mutant catfish based in an undersea laboratory. He sends two human hijackers to loot the passing cargo ships. Samson and Goliath find their way into the lab, where they escape from a number of death traps. Although they flood the lab, the evil trio escape.
 Hijackers are two men, working in tandem, are sent by Salamandro to steal gold bullion and paintings from a couple of ships.  They come close to also stealing a stash of jewels from a third ship, but never get the chance to commit this third crime.  None of the stolen goods are ever recovered.
 Baron Von Skull is an elderly World War One flying ace from Germany, who creates evil war machines. Samson and Goliath destroy the machines, but Baron Von Skull and Tor fly away presumably into the arms of the police.
 Tor is Baron von Skull's assistant.
 Kunev Khan is apparently a long-time enemy of Samson and Goliath. He steals the Graviton and delivers it to the Moon Leader, not realizing the alien intends to double-cross him. After the Moon Leader is defeated, Kunev Khan is flown back to Earth by Samson and Goliath.
 The Moon Leader is an alien with whom Kunev Khan was allied, who subsequently double-crossed him. The Moon Leader is dispatched and Samson and Goliath fly Kunev and the Graviton back to Earth.
 The Dragon Men are a tribe of possible Mayan ancestry, based in an underground city. Samson and Goliath enter the city via a Mayan pyramid in order to rescue Professor Kinkaid, who had been captured by these warriors. The Dragon Men are defeated when Goliath's roar breaks open a dam, releasing water that sweeps them away, and also puts out a fire that started when a dragon lizard ignited the sulfur gases.
 Dr. Zuran is yet another mad scientist who captures Professor Cartwell, and gains control of Rogor the robot. He transfers Samson's strength to the mechanical monster, but Goliath restores it. Zuran also tries to kill Cartwell, but Samson saves him just in time. Zuran flies away and Cartwell fixes up Rogor turning him into a good useful robot.
 Darvo and his assistant revive the Coral Creature, which begins attacking a city in Australia. Samson and Goliath cause it to turn against its masters, destroying them and their lighthouse.
 The Coral Creature is a coral monster which Darvo revived. Following Darvo's defeat, the Coral Creature returns to the sea.
 The Dome and his henchman plot to launch nuclear warheads. Samson and Goliath successfully thwart their efforts.
 Nerod is an avid collector of Roman antiquities who models himself on Nero. He and Servo invite Samson and Goliath to fight robot gladiators and rhinoceros in a replica of the Colosseum. The heroes defeat their foes, and destroy the mansion.
 Servo is Nerod's henchman.
 Dr. Desto is a scientist who had been experimenting with the time dimension. He brings in a number of past threats, and pits them against Samson and Goliath. All are defeated, and Desto himself is pulled into the past, never to return.
 Narton and The Gill Men emerge from the ocean floor to conquer the surface people. Samson and Goliath beat them at their own game, but Narton gets away vowing to return.
 The Gill Men are Narton's henchmen.
 The Thing from the Black Mountains is a reptile that is roused from a lake near the Black Mountains by a missile. Samson and Goliath fight it and send it back into the lake.

Episodes

Home media
On March 8, 2011, Warner Archive released all 20 episodes of The Space Kidettes and Young Samson on DVD in region 1 as part of their Hanna–Barbera Classics Collection. This is a manufacture-on-demand (MOD) release, available exclusively through Warner's online store and Amazon.com.  The original network broadcasts of The Space Kidettes and Samson & Goliath were formatted to break up the plot line of each episode to include additional animated content not made by Hanna-Barbera, but which were controlled by the series’ sponsor.

After the network runs ended, both stories were re-edited into continuous scenarios, and the two series were joined together as The Space Kidettes and Young Samson for subsequent forms of distribution. The revised syndication versions of these shows are the only ones available for distribution, as the original network versions were cut and reconformed for the current configuration. These are the versions used for the DVD release.

References

External links
 Young Samson & Goliath at the Big Cartoon DataBase
 

Television series by Hanna-Barbera
NBC original programming
1960s American animated television series
1967 American television series debuts
1968 American television series endings
American children's animated superhero television series
Hanna-Barbera superheroes
DC Comics superheroes
Teen animated television series
Teen superhero television series
Fictional characters with superhuman strength
Fictional characters who can move at superhuman speeds
American children's animated action television series
American children's animated adventure television series
American children's animated fantasy television series
Animated television series about dogs
Cultural depictions of Samson